Dialium lopense is a species of legume in the family Fabaceae.
It is found only in Gabon.
It is threatened by habitat loss.

References

lopense
Endemic flora of Gabon
Near threatened flora of Africa
Taxonomy articles created by Polbot